Scotto, Scotz, or Scot was a Genoese troubadour of the mid-thirteenth century. His identity is shrouded in obscurity and scholars have suggested that his full name was perhaps Ogerio Scotto, Alberto Scotto, or Scotto Scotti. A document of 25 September 1239 names Guglielmo (William), Corrado (Conrad), Balbo, and Scotto as four brothers of the Scotti family, lending credence to the last suggestion.

In all copies of his only surviving work, his name appears in the Occitan rubrics as "Scotz". This lone surviving piece is a tenso (and a descort)—Scotz, quals mais vos plazeria—with Bonifaci Calvo, another troubadour of Genoa. It could have been written either before Calvo left Genoa (c.1250) or after he returned in 1266.

Sources
Bertoni, Giulio. I Trovatori d'Italia: Biografie, testi, tradizioni, note. Rome: Società Multigrafica Editrice Somu, 1967 [1915].

13th-century Genoese people
13th-century Italian troubadours